John Joseph Miller (born 1970) is an American author, journalist and educator. He is the director of the journalism program at Hillsdale College.

He also writes for National Review, for which he was previously the national political reporter, The Wall Street Journal, and other publications. He founded The College Fix, a conservative higher education watchdog.

Early life
Born in Detroit, Miller was raised in both Michigan and Florida.  He graduated from J. P. Taravella High School in 1988. Miller then attended the University of Michigan, where he was the editor-in-chief of the conservative student newspaper, The Michigan Review.

Career
His first job was at The New Republic, in Washington, D.C. After that, he worked for the Center for Equal Opportunity as well as at the Heritage Foundation, as a Bradley Fellow.
He sometimes wrote for Reason and became a contributing editor there.

He joined National Review in 1998, and continues to contribute to National Review Online.

Miller founded The College Fix, a right-leaning conservative website funded by the Student Free Press Association.

In 2009 Miller self published the historical thriller novel The First Assassin.

In 2011 HarperCollins published Miller's The Big Scrum, a book detailing safety reforms to American football led by President Theodore Roosevelt.

Works
The Unmaking Of Americans: How Multiculturalism has Undermined the Assimilation Ethic (1998)
Our Oldest Enemy: A History of America's Disastrous Relationship with France (co-authored with Mark Molesky, 2004)
A Gift of Freedom: How the John M. Olin Foundation Changed America (2005)
The First Assassin: A Novel (2009)
The Big Scrum: How Teddy Roosevelt Saved Football (2011)

References

External links
Miller's official website
Author Archive at National Review Online
Author Archive at Reason
1998 Bio (and lecture based on The Unmaking of Americans, available in .ram format) at the Ashbrook Center

"The Stalinist and the Stamp" Why is the Postal Service honoring a commie?" by Miller, The Wall Street Journal,  6 July 2001
"The Writing Life" Miller explains how he came to be a writer

1970 births
Living people
American male journalists
American magazine editors
The Heritage Foundation
National Review people
J. P. Taravella High School alumni
University of Michigan alumni
Writers from Detroit
People from Coral Springs, Florida
21st-century American journalists